Dublin University Football Club (DUFC) is the rugby union club of the University of Dublin and Trinity College, in Dublin, Ireland, which plays in Division 1A of the All-Ireland League.

History

The first known record of the Club appears under the heading 'Trinity College' in the Daily Express of 1 December 1855 and is taken to show that it had then been in existence for at least a year:

The club had thus been founded by about 1854, and it has a well-documented, continuous history since then, which gives it a strong claim to be considered the world's oldest extant football club of any code. Although Guy's Hospital FC, had been founded in London in 1843, so had existed before DUFC, it later folded up for some years during the nineteenth century. Football in Trinity pre-dates the foundation of the Club itself. A poem by Edward Lysaght shows that it was being played in the College Park in the 1780s.

Being the oldest rugby club in Ireland, DUFC has won its fair share of trophies over the years. Its most notable achievement in recent years was the winning of the All-Ireland League Division 2 in the 2003-04 season, which also gained the club promotion to Division 1. This level of competition was short-lived, however, with the club returning to Division 2 after two seasons.

Present status
The DUFC 1st XV currently plays in Division 1A of the All-Ireland League. The club also fields three Junior teams who compete in the Leinster J1, J3 and J4 Metro Leagues, and two U20 teams who play in the JP Fanagan Premier and Pennant leagues respectively. They are the current Frazer McMullen All Ireland Champions, beating Clontarf U20 in the 2018 final.

The 1stXV plays against University College Dublin in the annual Colours Match which has been ongoing since its inception in 1952. Trinity has won on 24 occasions, the latest being the 2017/18 match.
The club also has a Women's XV, which has played in AIL division 3.

In October 2020, the club had three players, Liam Turner, Michael Silvester and Jack Dunne, play in Leinster's Pro14 win over Zebre.

Grounds
The club's main playing field is College Park, which is within the grounds of Trinity in the Dublin city centre. It also has two other football fields used mainly by the Junior teams on Santry Avenue in the Dublin suburb of Santry.

Notable players

Ireland
Dublin University Football Club has a long tradition of its players gaining the highest international honours, with over 160 past players being capped for Ireland since 1875. Some of the most famous and presently memorable are listed below.

British & Irish Lions
DUFC also has a long history of providing British & Irish Lions tourists, with the most recent contribution being Jamie Heaslip in 2013.

Ireland coaches
Dublin University past players Roly Meates and Gerry Murphy both went on to coach Ireland at different times. Meates is also an honorary life member of DUFC, having coached the club for 28 years.

Honours
All-Ireland Cup (1): 1925-26
 Leinster Senior Cup (19): 1883, 1884, 1886, 1887, 1890, 1893, 1895, 1897, 1898, 1900, 1905, 1907, 1908, 1912, 1920, 1921, 1926, 1960, 1976

References

External links
Official Twitter

 
Rugby clubs established in 1854
Rugby Union
Irish rugby union teams
Rugby union clubs in Dublin (city)
University and college rugby union clubs in Ireland
1854 establishments in Ireland
Senior Irish rugby clubs (Leinster)